Cumberland was an electoral district of the Legislative Assembly in the Australian state of New South Wales in outer western Sydney named after Cumberland County. It was created as a three-member electorate with the introduction of proportional representation in 1920, replacing Camden and Hawkesbury. It was abolished in 1927 and replaced by Hawkesbury, Nepean, and parts of Bankstown, Lakemba and Hornsby.

Members for Cumberland

Election results

See also
From 1856 until 1859 there were three districts covering the area.
Electoral district of Cumberland Boroughs which covered the towns in the area - Richmond, Windsor, Liverpool and Campbelltown.
Electoral district of Cumberland (South Riding)
Electoral district of Cumberland (North Riding)

References

Former electoral districts of New South Wales
Constituencies established in 1920
Constituencies disestablished in 1927
1920 establishments in Australia
1927 disestablishments in Australia